Plaguewielder is the eighth studio album by Norwegian black metal band Darkthrone. It was released 10 September 2001 by Moonfog Productions.

The album was reissued with new artwork in 2011 by Peaceville Records. The CD edition included a second disc of commentary from the band members.

Track listing
All music written by Nocturno Culto, except where noted.
All lyrics by Fenriz.

Personnel
Nocturno Culto – electric guitar, bass guitar, vocals
Fenriz – drums
Apollyon and Sverre Dæhli – backing vocals on "Command"

Production
Arranged and produced by Darkthrone.
Recorded and engineered by Dag Stokke at Studio Studio Nyhagen

References

Darkthrone albums
2001 albums